Gangnam Scandal (stylized as Kangnam Scandal) is a South Korean television series starring Lim Yoon-ho, Shin Go-eun, Seo Do-young, Bang Eun-hee and Hwang Bo-mi. It aired daily on SBS from November 26, 2018 to May 17, 2019.

Synopsis
In Seoul, a Cinderella tries to find her prince.

Cast

Main
 Lim Yoon-ho as Choi Seo-joon
 Shin Go-eun as Eun So-yoo
 Seo Do-young as Hong Se-hyun
 Bang Eun-hee as Hong Baek-hee
 Hwang Bo-mi as Myung Ji-yoon

Supporting

People around Choi Seo-joon
 Im Chae-moo as Choi Jin-bok (Seo-joon's father)
 Kim Kwang-min as Mo Tae-woong (Seo-joon's brother)
 Lee Yoo-jin as Choi Seo-hyung (Seo-joon's big sister)
 Hwang Geum-byul as Choi Seo-kyung (Seo-joon's other sister)
 Won Ki-joon as Bang Yoon-tae (Seo-joon's brother-in-law)

People around Eun So-yoo
 Chu Gwi-jung as Oh Geum-hee (So-yoo's mother)
 Ahn Ji-hwan as Eun Jae-man (So-yoo's father)
 Hae In as Eun So-dam (So-yoo's little sister)

Others
 Kyeon Mi-ri as Jang Mi-ri
 Choi Su-rin as Baek Choon-mi	
 Choi Baek-sun as Wang Tae-bok
 Min Ji-young as Bang Soo-kyung
 Jang Jung-hee as President Ko
 Lee Chang as Team Leader Lee
 Lee Hoon-sung as Team Leader Hwang
 Lee Hae-woon as Choi Jin-wook
 Kim Joon-hwan as Kim Woong-ki
 Seo Woo-jin as (Supporting)
 Baek Hyun-joo as Park Mak-rye

Ratings
 In this table,  represent the lowest ratings and  represent the highest ratings.
 NR denotes that the drama did not rank in the top 20 daily programs on that date.
 N/A denotes that the rating is not known.

Notes

References

External links
  
 

Seoul Broadcasting System television dramas
2018 South Korean television series debuts
Korean-language television shows
2019 South Korean television series endings